Japanese kawaii metal group Babymetal has released three studio albums, twelve live albums, one compilation album, ten video albums, one EP, thirteen singles, and eighteen music videos. Additionally, the group has released music and footage exclusively for the band's defunct fanclub Babymetal Apocalypse and current fanclub The One. As such, these are not included in the main count and are listed separately.

The group debuted as a subunit of the Japanese idol group Sakura Gakuin, performing the track "Doki Doki ☆ Morning" on their debut album Sakura Gakuin 2010 Nendo: Message (2011), releasing several other singles through the years. Babymetal became an independent act from Sakura Gakuin in 2013. The songs released would appear on the group's eponymous debut album Babymetal in 2014. The album would chart in several countries, including on the Billboard 200 in the United States, a rare feat for Japanese artists. Babymetal later rereleased the album physically internationally in 2015, promoting the single "Road of Resistance", and has since been certified Gold in Japan.

The group's second album, Metal Resistance was released in 2016, peaking at number two on the Oricon Weekly Albums chart, certified Gold in Japan, entering the top forty on the Billboard 200, and setting a record for the highest position on the UK Albums Chart for a Japanese artist at number fifteen. In 2019, the band released their third album, Metal Galaxy, which peaked at number thirteen on the Billboard 200, becoming the highest charting Japanese language album in the chart's history. They also became the first Asian act to top the Billboard Rock Albums chart.

Albums

Studio albums

Live albums 

"The One" exclusive limited releases
 Live at Budokan: Black Night (2015) — released as part of the Budo-can.
 Legend 2015: New Year Fox Festival (2015)
 Babymetal World Tour 2014 Apocalypse (2021)
 Trilogy -Metal Resistance Episode III- Apocalypse (2021)
 The Fox Festivals In Japan 2017 -The Five Fox Festival- Selection (2021)
 The Fox Festivals In Japan 2017 -Big Fox Festival- (2021)
 Metal Resistance Episode VII -Apocrypha- The Chosen Seven (2021)
 Babymetal Awakens -The Sun Also Rises- (2021)
 Babymetal Arises -Beyond The Moon- Legend -M- (2021)
 Metal Galaxy World Tour In Japan (2021)
 10 Babymetal Legends Live Vinyl Series -The One Special Tour Boxset- (2021)

Compilation albums

Video albums 

"The One" exclusive limited releases
 Babymetal World Tour 2014 Apocalypse (2015)
 Legend 2015: New Year Fox Festival (2015)
 Trilogy: Metal Resistance Episode III – Apocalypse (2016) — later made available in limited quantities on September 19, 2016.
 The Chosen 500 (2018) — limited to five hundred copies.
 The Fox Festivals in Japan 2017: The Five Fox Festival & Big Fox Festival (2018)
 Metal Resistance Episode VII – Apocrypha: The Chosen Seven (2019)
Babymetal Awakens: The Sun Also Rises (2020)
Babymetal Arises: Beyond the Moon – Legend M (2020)
Metal Galaxy World Tour in Japan (2020)

EPs

Singles

Other charted songs

Music videos

Notes

References 

Discography
Discographies of Japanese artists
Heavy metal group discographies